Angaria neglecta is a species of sea snail, a marine gastropod mollusk in the family Angariidae.

Description

The shell can grow to be 40 mm in length.

Distribution
Angaria neglecta can be found from Japan to Australia.

Original description
  Poppe G.T. & Goto Y. (1993) Recent Angariidae. Ancona: Informatore Piceno. 32 pls, 10 pls.

References

External links
 Worms Link

Angariidae
Gastropods described in 1993